The Cono Este or Lima Este (East Lima in english) is one of the six areas that make up the Lima Metropolitan Area. It is located in the eastern part of the metropolis hence its name. The socioeconomic levels of its residents are varied. They mainly belong however to the middle class. Wealthier residents can be found in a few districts in this area as many people move to this area to escape the cloudy winters of Lima. During the winter, this is the only area of Lima that is not permanently covered by fog. The most developed areas of this section are certain retirement urbanizations in Lurigancho-Chosica and Chaclacayo. These areas are home to picturesque winter housing developments owned by people seeking to escape the winter fog. Santa Anita presents the highest degree of urban consolidation, while being the smallest district on the area. La Molina is a mainly residential district which gathers people of the high socioeconomic status, it also concentrates commercial activities. The least developed are those of El Agustino which is populated by slum housing, and Cieneguilla, which is mostly unurbanized. The district of Ate has to some extent undergone industrialization with several factories having been built there.

Districts 
The following districts are part of Lima Este:

Ate
La Molina (currently part of the Lima Modern districts)
Pachacamac (currently part of Cono Sur)
Cieneguilla
Chaclacayo
El Agustino
Lurigancho
San Juan de Lurigancho (currently part of Cono Norte)
San Luis
Santa Anita

References

Geography of Lima